For Church Cove, Gunwalloe, see Gunwalloe

Church Cove is a hamlet in the civil parish of Landewednack in Cornwall, England. The parish is notable for being the most southern point on British mainland.

Church Cove lies within the Cornwall Area of Outstanding Natural Beauty (AONB).

Parts of the hamlet lie within Caerthillian to Kennack SSSI (Site of Special Scientific Interest).

References

External links

Hamlets in Cornwall